Rinaldo Melucci (born 26 January 1977) is an Italian politician. He is member of the Democratic Party.

He was born in Taranto, Italy. He is married and has three children. Melucci was elected Mayor of Taranto on 26 June 2017. He was re-elected for a second term on 13 June 2022.

See also
 2017 Italian local elections
 List of mayors of Taranto

References

External links 
 

Living people
1977 births
People from Taranto
Democratic Party (Italy) politicians
21st-century Italian politicians
Mayors of Taranto